Bapi Saha (born 28 September 1991) is an Indian footballer who plays as a defender for Prayag United S.C. in the I-League.

Career

Prayag United
Saha made his debut for Prayag United in an I-League match on 21 January 2011 against Viva Kerala in which Prayag United drew the match 1–1 and in which Saha played the whole 90 minutes. In 2014-15 SESSION He joined Peerless F.C. IN 2015-16 SEASON. In 2015-16 Season Bapi will be playing Southern Samity football club in CFL.

mahamayatala sporting
In 2017, Bapi joined Mahamayatala sporting as a full time khep player. In 2019 Bapi was arrested for a domestic violence, theresult of which Mahamayatala kicked him off the team.

Career statistics

Club
Statistics accurate as of 19 January 2013

References

1991 births
Living people
Footballers from West Bengal
I-League players
Association football defenders
Indian footballers
United SC players
Place of birth missing (living people)